The 1978–79 Washington Capitals season was the Washington Capitals fifth season in the National Hockey League (NHL).

Offseason

Regular season

Final standings

Schedule and results

Playoffs
The Capitals once again failed to make the playoffs.

Player statistics

Regular season
Scoring

Goaltending

Note: GP = Games played; G = Goals; A = Assists; Pts = Points; +/- = Plus/minus; PIM = Penalty minutes; PPG=Power-play goals; SHG=Short-handed goals; GWG=Game-winning goals
      MIN=Minutes played; W = Wins; L = Losses; T = Ties; GA = Goals against; GAA = Goals against average; SO = Shutouts;

Awards and records

Transactions

Draft picks
Washington's draft picks at the 1978 NHL Amateur Draft held at the Queen Elizabeth Hotel in Montreal, Quebec.

Farm teams

See also
1978–79 NHL season

References

External links
 

Washington Capitals seasons
Wash
Wash
Washing
Washing